Tennantia is a monotypic genus of flowering plants belonging to the family Rubiaceae. It only contains one known species, Tennantia sennii

Description
The leaf-blades are elliptic to narrowly obovate in shape. The fruit (or seed capsule) is black,  in diameter and glabrous.

Its native range is from Somalia to Kenya and Tanzania in eastern Tropical Africa.

The genus name of Tennantia is in honour of James Robert Tennant (b. 1928), a British botanist working at Kew Gardens. The Latin specific epithet of sennii honors Lorenzo Senni (1879 - 1954), an Italian botanist who collected the type specimen. Both the genus and the species were first described and published in Kew Bull. Vol.36 on page 511 in 1981.

References

Rubiaceae
Rubiaceae genera
Plants described in 1981
Flora of Somalia
Flora of Kenya
Flora of Tanzania